South Delta Exchange is a transit exchange located adjacent to the South Delta Recreation Centre in the community of Tsawwassen, British Columbia, Canada. Opened on October 31, 1975, the exchange serves Delta and Richmond.

Routes

See also
List of bus routes in Metro Vancouver

References

External links
South Delta Exchange map (PDF file)

TransLink (British Columbia) bus stations